Avadel Pharmaceuticals plc , is a specialty pharmaceutical company. Avadel markets products in the hospital and primary care spaces. The Company is headquartered in Dublin, Ireland with operations in St. Louis, Missouri and Lyon, France.

The company was founded as Flamel Technologies SA in Lyon, France in 1990.

The company acquired Éclat Pharmaceuticals of St. Louis, Missouri in March 2012.

On 8 February 2016, the company acquired  FSC Holdings, LLC, which included its wholly owned subsidiaries FSC Pediatrics, Inc., FSC Therapeutics, LLC, and FSC Laboratories, Inc.

On 3 January 2017, Flamel, Éclat, and FCS Pediatrics became Avadel Pharmaceuticals plc  after the Company completed a cross-border merger from France to Ireland.

In 2019, Mike Anderson, CEO of Avadel Pharmaceuticals has resigned, and Gregory Divis, COO of the company was appointed as his temporary successor. Meanwhile, Craig Stapleton, chairman of the Dublin-headquartered Avadel, has also stepped down. That same year, the company filed for Chapter 11 bankruptcy.

References

External links 
 Official Website

Companies listed on the Nasdaq
Pharmaceutical companies established in 1990
Companies that filed for Chapter 11 bankruptcy in 2019